Calothamnus arcuatus is a plant in the myrtle family, Myrtaceae and is endemic to the south-west of Western Australia. (In 2014 Craven, Edwards and Cowley proposed that the species be renamed Melaleuca arcuata.) It is a shrub with prickly, cylindrical leaves with a slight, upward curve and bright red flowers in small groups near the older leaves.

Description
They are glabrous, spreading from the stem and curve slightly upwards.

The flowers are bright red and arranged in small clusters amongst the older leaves. The outer edge of the flower cup (the hypanthium) and the sepals are densely covered with soft hairs.

Taxonomy and naming
Calothamnus arcuatus was first formally described in 2010 by Alex George from a specimen found near Enaebba. "The Latin arcuatus (curved like a bow) refers to the leaves".

Distribution and habitat
Calothamnus arcuatus occurs in two separate areas - one to the north east of Eneabba and the other to the north east of Arrino, in the Avon Wheatbelt and Geraldton Sandplains biogeographic regions. It grows in sand, sometimes with lateritic gravel on sandplains and ridges.

Conservation
Calothamnus arcuatus is classified as "Priority Two" by the Western Australian Government Department of Parks and Wildlife meaning that it is poorly known and from one or a few locations.

References

arcuatus
Myrtales of Australia
Plants described in 2010
Endemic flora of Western Australia